The India men's national under-18 ice hockey team is the men's national under-18 ice hockey team of the India. The team is controlled by the Ice Hockey Association of India, a member of the International Ice Hockey Federation.

History
The Inda men's national under-18 ice hockey team played its first game in 2012 during the 2012 IIHF U18 Challenge Cup of Asia being held in Abu Dhabi, United Arab Emirates. India finished fourth after winning only one game against Hong Kong and losing their other three games against Malaysia, Thailand and the United Arab Emirates. The game against the United Arab Emirates was recorded as India's largest loss in international competition after they lost the game 1–31.

Roster
From the 2012 IIHF U18 Challenge Cup of Asia

International competitions
2012 IIHF U18 Challenge Cup of Asia. Finish: 4th

References

External links
Ice Hockey Association of India

Ice hockey in India
National under-18 ice hockey teams
Ice hockey